Defending champion Jan Zieliński and his partner Hugo Nys defeated Lloyd Glasspool and Harri Heliövaara in the final, 7–6(7–5), 6–4 to win the doubles tennis title at the 2022 Moselle Open.

Hubert Hurkacz and Zieliński were the reigning champions, but Hurkacz did not participate this year.

Seeds

Draw

Draw

References

External links
 Main draw

Moselle Open - Doubles